During the 2013–14 Panionios B.C. season, the Panionios professional basketball team of Nea Smyrni, Athens, was captained by Gaios Skordilis and coached by Ioannis Sfairopoulos. The team won 18 games and lost 8, in the regular season of the Greek Basketball League, and also reached the semifinals of the Greek Cup.

Roster

Depth chart

Transfers 2013

In

Out

Matches

Greek Basketball League

Results summary

Wins 18
Defeats 8
First Round

Second Round

Greek Basketball Cup
Quarter-Finals

Semi-Finals

Eurocup Basketball
Regular Season

Last 32

2013-14 
2013–14 in Greek basketball by club